Consecration is the transfer of a person or a thing to the sacred sphere for a special purpose or service. The word consecration literally means "association with the sacred". Persons, places, or things can be consecrated, and the term is used in various ways by different groups. The origin of the word comes from the Latin stem consecrat, which means dedicated, devoted, and sacred. A synonym for consecration is sanctification; its antonym is desecration.

Buddhism

Images of the Buddha and bodhisattvas are ceremonially consecrated in a broad range of Buddhist rituals that vary depending on the Buddhist traditions. Buddhābhiseka is a Pali and Sanskrit term referring to these consecration rituals.

Christianity 

In Christianity, consecration means "setting apart" a person, as well as a building or object, for God. Among some Christian denominations there is a complementary service of "deconsecration", to remove a consecrated place of its sacred character in preparation for either demolition or sale for secular use.

Catholic Church 

"Consecration" is used in the Catholic Church as the setting apart for the service of God, of both persons and objects.

Ordination of bishops 
The ordination of a new bishop is also called a consecration. While the term "episcopal ordination" is now more common, "consecration" was the preferred term from the Middle Ages through the period including the Second Vatican Council (11 October 1962 – 8 December 1965).

The Vatican II document Sacrosanctum Concilium n. 76 states,

The English text of Catechism of the Catholic Church, Second Edition, 1997, under the heading "Episcopal ordination—fullness of the sacrament of Holy Orders", uses "episcopal consecration" and "episcopal ordination" interchangeably (CCC, 1556–1558).

The 1983 Code of Canon Law of the Latin Church under "Title VI—Orders" uses the term sacrae ordinationis minister "minister of sacred ordination" and the term consecratione episcopali "episcopal consecration" (CCL,  1012, 1014).

Consecrated life 

Consecrated virgins are consecrated by the diocesan bishop according to the approved liturgical rite and spend their time in works of penance and mercy, in apostolic activity and in prayer.

Those who enter religious institutes, societies of apostolic life, secular institutes or are recognised as a diocesan hermit are also members of the consecrated life.

Churches, altars, and other ritual objects 
Chrism, an anointing oil, is (usually scented) olive oil consecrated by a bishop.

Objects such as patens and chalices, used for the sacrament of the Eucharist, are consecrated by a bishop, using chrism. The day before a new priest is ordained, there may be a vigil and a service or Mass at which the ordaining Bishop consecrates the paten(s) and chalice(s) of the ordinands (the men who are transitional deacons, about to be ordained priests).

A more solemn rite exists for what used to be called the "consecration of an altar", either of the altar alone or as the central part of the rite for a church. The rite is now called the dedication.  Since it would be contradictory to dedicate to the service of God a mortgage-burdened building, the rite of solemn dedication of a church is carried out only if the building is debt-free.

Eucharist 

A very special act of consecration is that of the Eucharistic gifts bread and wine in the Holy Mass, which according to Catholic belief involves their change into the Body and Blood of Christ, a change referred to as transubstantiation.

Eastern churches 

In the Eastern Orthodox Churches and the Eastern Catholic Churches, the term "consecration" can refer to either the Sacred Mystery (sacrament) of Cheirotonea (ordination through laying on of hands) of a bishop, or the sanctification and solemn dedication of a church building. It can also (more rarely) be used to describe the change of the bread and wine into the Body and Blood of Christ at the Divine Liturgy. The Chrism used at Chrismation and the Antimension placed on the Holy Table are also said to be consecrated.

Lutheran Church and Anglican Communion 

Church buildings, chapels, altars, and Communion vessels are consecrated for the purpose of religious worship.

A person may be consecrated for a specific role within a religious hierarchy, or a person may consecrate his or her life in an act of devotion.  In particular, the ordination of a bishop is often called a consecration. In churches that follow the doctrine of apostolic succession (the historical episcopate), the bishops who consecrate a new bishop are known as the consecrators and form an unbroken line of succession back to the Apostles. Those who take the vows of religious life are said to be living a consecrated life.

In the Church of England (Mother Church of the Anglican Communion), an order closing a church may remove the legal effects of consecration.

Methodist churches

Entire consecration 
In Methodist theology, entire consecration is an act made by an individual who has experienced the New Birth, but prior to entire sanctification:

In a prayer of entire consecration, a Christian surrenders himself/herself to God in order to allow Him to entirely sanctify his/her soul. A believer offers to God "his time, his plans, his possessions, himself, his all" in consecration. As such, consecration is "a pledge of an eternal 'yes' to all the will of God" in Wesleyan-Arminian theology. With this human initiative of setting oneself apart for God, the believer is able to be entirely sanctified; the theology behind consecration is summarized with the maxim "Give yourself to God in all things, if you would have God give Himself to you." United Methodist elder Craig Adams in discussing "the need for a particular moment of consecration and faith in a believer’s life", referenced the theological tract On the Act or Covenant of Religious Consecration, authored by Thomas Cogswell Upham, which provides the following prayer of consecration composed by cleric Philip Doddridge as an example:

The Probationer's Handbook, one of the most widely used catechisms of the Methodist Episcopal Church for probationers seeking full membership in the connexion, provided probationers a prayer of entire consecration to be used if the probationer had not already consecrated himself/herself to God; it implored the probationer: "If you are
not fully consecrated to God, lay all on the altar immediately."

Liturgies 
The Methodist Book of Worship for Church and Home (1965) contains liturgies for "The Order for the Consecration of Bishops", "An Office for the Consecration of Deaconesses", "An Office for the Consecration of Directors of Christian Education and Directors of Music", as well as "An Office for the Opening or Consecrating of a Church Building" among others.

Mormonism 

Mormonism is replete with consecration doctrine, primarily Christ's title of "The Anointed One" signifying his official, authorized and unique role as the savior of mankind from sin and death, and secondarily each individual's opportunity and ultimate responsibility to accept Jesus' will for their life and consecrate themselves to living thereby wholeheartedly.  Book of Mormon examples include "sanctification cometh because of their yielding their hearts unto God" (Heleman 3:35) and "come unto Christ, who is the Holy One of Israel, and partake of his salvation, and the power of his redemption, ... and offer your whole souls as an offering unto him, and continue in fasting and praying, and endure to the end; and as the Lord liveth ye will be saved" (Omni 1:26).

Hinduism

In most South Indian Hindu temples around the world, Kumbhabhishekam, or the temple's consecration ceremony, is done once every 12 years. It is usually done to purify the temple after a renovation or simply done to renew the purity of the temple. Hindus celebrate this event on the consecration date as the witnessing gives a good soul a thousand "punya", or good karma.

Jainism

Panch Kalyanaka Pratishtha  is a traditional Jain ceremony that consecrates one or more Jain Tirthankara icons with celebration of Panch Kalyanaka (five auspicious events). The ceremony is generally held when a new Jain temple is erected or new idols are installed in temples. The consecration must be supervised by a religious authority, an Acharya or a Bhattaraka or a scholar authorized by them.

Islam

Consecration is less prominent in Islam than in many other religions. Special consecration is not often a religious requirement.

Nonetheless, it is a feature of Muslim religious life in some cases. For example,
 In salah (prayer), once one has said the takbir to begin, one is in a specially consecrated state and may not talk, eat, or do other worldly things.
 Once the sacred month of Ramadan has entered, Muslims are expected to dedicate themselves to the fast and are also expected to make more than the usual effort to avoid wrongdoing.
 On the Hajj, once one has passed the Mawaqit, one must enter a state of consecration in which all wrongdoing is strenuously prohibited, as are some normally licit activities such as hunting, engaging in marital relations, and cutting or plucking one's hair.
 By the intention of building a masjid (dedicated mosque) upon it, land becomes permanently dedicated to God and cannot be owned by any human being. One may thereafter not enter inside the designated perimeter except in a state of ritual purity, and the land may never revert to any other use.

See also
 Consecration of Russia to the Immaculate Heart of Mary
 Covenant Service
 Prayer of Consecration to the Sacred Heart

References

Bibliography
Service Book of the Holy Orthodox-Catholic Apostolic Church, Isabel F. Hapgood (Antiochian Orthodox Christian Archdiocese of North America, New York) 1975.
Orthodox Dogmatic Theology: A Concise Exposition, Protopresbyter Michael Pomazansky (Tr. Hieromonk Seraphim Rose, Saint Herman of Alaska Brotherhood, Platina CA) 1984.
The Law of God, Archpriest Seraphim Slobodskoy (Tr. Holy Trinity Monastery, Jordanville NY) 1996.

External links

Consecration article in Catholic Encyclopedia
Consecration: The Human Side of Sanctification (Methodist)
Consecration of an Orthodox Church 6 pages of photos, Serbian Orthodox Church
Photos of Consecration of Altar and Antimens in the Russian Orthodox Church
The Sanctification of Holy Chrism by the Ecumenical Patriarchate
Virginity article in Catholic Encyclopedia discussing Consecration of a Virgin
Kumbhabhishekam  by the Modern International Hindu Agamic Cultural Organisation

Religious practices
Christian worship and liturgy
Christian terminology
Christian processions
Methodism